Boyz Unlimited is a British comedy series, which aired on Channel 4 in 1999. It was a six-part satire about the music industry. The plot centered on a young boy band featuring James Corden.

Cast
Frank Harper as Nigel Gacey
James Corden as Gareth Jones
Adam Sinclair as Jason Jackson
Lee Williams as Scott Le Tissier
Billy Worth as Nicky Vickery
Jo Whiley as Narrator
Vincenzo Nicoli as Mick McNamara
John Hodgkinson as Steve Peebles
Anna Wilson-Jones as Katie May

References

External links

1999 British television series debuts
1999 British television series endings
1990s British comedy television series
British musical television series
Channel 4 comedy
Films about boy bands
Television series by Hat Trick Productions
English-language television shows